The Platygloeales are an order of rust fungi in the class Pucciniomycetes.
It contains two families, the Eocronartiaceae  and also the Platygloeaceae.

Order Platygloeales are monophyletic group (they have a common ancestor). The results of a molecular analyses investigation in 2007, revealed that the former placement of Auriculoscypha genus in Platygloeales as in the Dictionary of the Fungi (as per Hawksworth et al. 1995; Kirk et al. 2001) can no longer be justified.

Description
Order Platygloeales are parasitic on mosses and other plants. They are saprobes on wood or they parasitize other fungi, ferns, mosses or other vascular plants. They have pycnium (fruiting body of rusts) which forms masses of hyphae (long, branching and filamentous structure) inside mosses; example genera include Platygloea and Eocronartium. As part of Order Pucciniales they typically have 5 spore stages and 2 alternate hosts. 
They generally have four-celled auriculariod basidia (a spore-producing structure). Most species have a haploid hyphal phase, (or a yeast state). Such as Calacogloea peniophorae. Achroomyces fimicola'''s yeast state is pink. 

Distribution
It has a cosmopolitan distribution. Including found on the Iberian Peninsula and Balearic Islands, and (Herpobasidium filicinum) is found in Japan (on fern Dennstaedtia wilfordii ). Species are found in Australia. They are also found in cold regions such as King George Island, maritime Antarctica.

Families
As accepted by Species Fungorum;
 Eocronartiaceae (12)
 Eocronartium - 1 sp.
 Herpobasidium - 4 spp.
 Jola - 4 spp.
 Platycarpa - 2 spp.
 Ptechetelium - 1 sp.Platygloeaceae  (55)
 Achroomyces - 33 spp.
 Calacogloea - 1 sp.
 Glomerogloea - 1 sp. 
 Glomopsis - 2 spp.
 Insolibasidium - 1 sp.

 Platygloea'' - 17 spp.

References

Basidiomycota orders
Taxa described in 1990